Yugoslav cuisine or Yugoslavian cuisine may be covered in the following articles:

Bosnia and Herzegovina cuisine
Croatian cuisine
Kosovan cuisine
Macedonian cuisine
Montenegrin cuisine
Serbian cuisine
Slovenian cuisine